BBC Radio Shetland is an opt-out service  of BBC Radio Scotland, covering the Shetland Islands, Scotland. The station's studio is located in Pitt Lane, Lerwick.

Programming
Radio Shetland has two programme slots, broadcast on  FM. It is also possible to listen live online via BBC Sounds and afterwards through a Mixcloud page.

A 30-minute magazine programme, Good Evening Shetland, is broadcast each weekday evening at 5.30pm, and includes news and current affairs, weather, fishing reports and public debate. A weekly dedications programme - Give Us A Tune - is broadcast on Friday evenings. The Monday to Thursday winter schedule also contains items on nature, food, football, film, health, history, politics, music and more.

The station relays BBC Radio Scotland programmes at all other times.

Staffing
Senior Producer: John Johnston
Producer: Mike Grundon
Reporters: Daniel Lawson, Adam Guest, Daniel Bennett

See also
BBC Radio Orkney

References

External links

1977 establishments in Scotland
BBC regional radio stations
BBC Scotland
Lerwick
Mass media in Shetland
Radio stations established in 1977
Radio stations in Scotland
Shetland music